is a Japanese football player who plays for FC Gifu.

Club statistics
Updated to 23 February 2018.

1Includes FIFA Club World Cup, J. League Championship, Suruga Bank Championship and Japanese Super Cup.

References

External links

Profile at Vissel Kobe

1986 births
Living people
Osaka University of Health and Sport Sciences alumni
Association football people from Shiga Prefecture
Japanese footballers
J1 League players
J2 League players
J3 League players
Kashiwa Reysol players
Urawa Red Diamonds players
Vissel Kobe players
FC Gifu players
Association football defenders